Gottlieb Adelbert Delbrück (January 16, 1822 in Magdeburg – May 26, 1890 in Kreuzlingen) was a German banker and businessman.

Early life 
His father Gottlied Delbrück (1777–1842) worked in Magdeburg. The Delbrück family was a prominent family of Lutheran theologians and lawyers in Prussia. Delbrück studied Lutheran theology and law. After university studies he worked as a lawyer.

Career 
In 1854, he founded Delbrück Leo & Co. In 1870, Delbrück was a co-founder of German company Deutsche Bank. From 1870 to 1875 Delbrück he was member of Vorstand in Association of German Chambers of Industry and Commerce. Delbrück was member of German Progress Party.
Delbrück was married with Luise Jonas (1831–1922). His son Ludwig Delbrück (1860–1913) became leader of company Bank Delbrück Leo & Co..

Literature

External links 

 Biography by Historische Gesellschaft of Deutsche Bank

German company founders
19th-century German businesspeople
German bankers
Deutsche Bank people
Jurists from Lower Saxony
1822 births
1890 deaths
Businesspeople from Magdeburg